Parliamentary elections were held in Georgia on May 21, 2008. President Mikheil Saakashvili proposed a referendum on bringing them forward from October to April after the 2007 Georgian demonstrations. The referendum was held at the same time as the early presidential election on 5 January 2008; according to exit polls, voters were largely in favour of having the elections in spring.

The Central Election Commission has registered 3,458,020 voters. The election was observed by 14 international and 31 local organizations.

Pre-election process 

The pre-election process has principally been monitored by the Parliamentary Assembly of the Council of Europe (PACE) as well as several local watchdogs. The PACE observers have reported “little or no improvement” in the political climate since the January 5 presidential election which was held in the tense aftermath of the November 2007 political crisis and resulted in the reelection of Mikheil Saakashvili to his second term. The monitoring mission has noted that “the political climate is still dominated by a lack of trust and absence of constructive dialogue between the authorities and the opposition”, one result of this being “the failure of the electoral reform that the authorities and the opposition agreed upon in the aftermath of the November 2007 events.”

The amendments to the election code passed by the Parliament in March 2008 took into account recommendations made by the PACE, such as abolition of the additional voters’ lists and voter registration on polling day; lowering of the election threshold from 7% to 5%; the simplification and clarification of election related complaints and appeals procedures; the introduction of party representation in the District Election Commissions. However, the PACE noted that a number of its other recommendations remained unaddressed.

This period has also witnessed significant reshuffle within the major political players. On February 29, 2008, the moderate Republican Party of Georgia left the nine-party opposition coalition, which spearheaded anti-government protests in November 2007, announcing that they would run independently for the parliamentary election, targeting mainly moderate and undecided voters. On the other hand, the opposition New Rights party, which had distanced themselves from the 2007 demonstrations, now joined the nine-party coalition under an election bloc named United Opposition–New Rights.

Another key event, which sent shockwaves across Georgia's political scene on April 21, 2008, was the refusal by Nino Burjanadze, the outgoing parliamentary chairwoman and Saakashvili's ally, to run on the president-led United National Movement (UNM) ticket, citing an absence of consensus within the UNM leadership regarding the party list.

Contending parties 

Three election blocs and nine parties are contesting this election. These are:

United National Movement, current ruling party led by President Saakashvili;
United Opposition: the National Council – New Rights, a bloc uniting a nine-party alliance (Freedom Movement, Conservative Party of Georgia, Party of Georgia, People's Party, Movement for United Georgia, National Forum, Georgia's Way, Georgian Troupe, On Our Own Party) with David Gamkrelidze's New Right which is led by the former presidential candidate and Saakashvili's principal rival Levan Gachechiladze;
Republican Party of Georgia, led by Davit Usupashvili;
Georgian Labour Party, led by Shalva Natelashvili;
Christian-Democratic Movement, founded and led by the former Imedi TV journalist Giorgi Targamadze;
Rightist Alliance – Topadze Industrialists, uniting Industry Will Save Georgia led by the beer magnate Gogi Topadze, the National Democratic Party and Unity led by the former Soviet Georgian leader Jumber Patiashvili;
Union of Georgian Traditionalists – Our Georgia – Georgian Women Party for Justice and Equality alliance;
Christian-Democratic Alliance, uniting the former presidential candidate Gia Maisashvili, the Green Party and Temur Shashiashvili, a former governor of Imereti region under ex-President Eduard Shevardnadze;
The Georgian Politics, a party recently set up by Gocha Pipia, a member of the outgoing parliament;
Our Country;
National Party of Radical-Democrats of Georgia;
Union of Georgian Sportsmen.

The Central Election Commission refused 37 political parties to register for the election for various irregularities in their submissions.

Opinion polls
On May 5, 2008, the United States-based company Greenberg Quinlan Rosner published results of the United National Movement-commissioned survey according to which the UNM had the support of 44 percent, compared to 12 percent for the United Opposition Council, 11 percent for the Christian Democratic Movement, 7 percent for the Labour Party of Georgia, and 4 percent for the Republican Party; 16 percent were undecided.

Conduct
On election day 21 May, there was a shooting incident in the village Khurcha near Zugdidi in the west of the country. Three people were taken to hospital. Close-up footage of the shooting was captured by a TV crew from Rustavi 2. President Saakashvili claimed that the shooting had been an attempt to disrupt the election. An investigation was carried out by the Norwegian Helsinki Committee within hours, and concluded that the shooting had most likely been carried out by Georgian forces.

On 22 May 2008, OSCE observers stated that the poll was an improvement from the presidential election held earlier that year, but that it was stilled marred by a number of imperfections. Early results indicated that UNM had 63% and the United Opposition Council 13%, but the opposition's partial results from Tbilisi gave the UOC 40% and UNM 32%. The first results indicate that the Christian Democrats and the Labour Party also cleared the threshold.

Results

Aftermath
The Joint Opposition and the Labour Party announced they would boycott parliament, which held its inaugural session on June 7, 2008, while the CDM refused to join them.

References

Georgia
Legislative election
Parliamentary elections in Georgia (country)
Election and referendum articles with incomplete results